St. Kitts and Nevis participated at the 2018 Summer Youth Olympics in Buenos Aires, Argentina from 6 October to 18 October 2018.

Athletics

References

2018 in Saint Kitts and Nevis
Nations at the 2018 Summer Youth Olympics
2018